Van Schendel and Van Schijndel are Dutch toponymic surnames meaning "from Schijndel" (locally Skendel), a town in North Brabant.  People with this name include:

Bernardus van Schijndel (1647–1709), Dutch genre painter, a.k.a. Bernardus van Schendel
Petrus van Schendel (1806–1870), Dutch-Belgian genre painter
Arthur van Schendel (1874–1946), Dutch writer of novels and short stories
Arthur F.E. van Schendel (1910–1979), Dutch art historian and museum director, son of Arthur
Antoon van Schendel (1910–1990), Dutch racing cyclist, brother of Albert
Albert van Schendel (1912–1990), Dutch racing cyclist, brother of Antoon
Jan van Schijndel (1927–2011), Dutch football midfielder

References

Dutch-language surnames
Toponymic surnames